Freeside may refer to:
 Freeside, a resort in space in the novel Neuromancer by William Gibson

See also
 Vision GLK Freeside, 2008 concept car of the Mercedes-Benz GLK-Class